The Web Ratna Awards is a category of award constituted by Ministry of Electronics and Information Technology to acknowledge exemplary initiatives of various states in the realm of e-governance. After 2014, it was renamed to Digital India Awards.

References

External links 
  (archive)

Awards established in 2009
Indian awards
Awards disestablished in 2014
Ministry of Communications and Information Technology (India)
E-government in India